The British Liquid Crystal Society (BLCS) is a charitable trust established to promote education and research on liquid crystals in the United Kingdom. It promotes dissemination of knowledge, education and research into and the study of all facets of the formation, evolution, and science of liquid crystals; their physical, chemical and other properties and functions in all products made therefrom. The Society also holds conferences to discuss the findings of such research.

References

External links
British Liquid Crystal Society website

Educational charities based in the United Kingdom
Liquid crystals
Scientific organisations based in the United Kingdom